Platais 8, also known as the a Carinae cluster or HIP 45080 Cluster is a small and faint open cluster located in the southern constellation Carina. It is estimated to be 440 light years distant based on parallax measurements.

The cluster was first noticed by astronomer Imants Platais in 1998. A 2005 paper suggests that Platais 8 might have formed near the area where the Scorpius-Centaurus association is located. The SIMBAD database lists the cluster having 28,185 members but the majority of the stars are field stars. In fact, there are only 32 members physically associated with the cluster.

Members 
These are the members of the cluster as identified by Canat-Gaudin et al. (2018)

The cluster also has one potential stream star located in Volans and was considered to be a background object prior to 2020.

References 

Carina (constellation)
Open clusters
Stellar associations
Star clusters